Naibli is a village in the Agdam Rayon of Azerbaijan.

References
 

Populated places in Aghdam District